Acacia subulata, commonly known as awl-leaf wattle, is a shrub endemic to New South Wales in Australia.

The species grows to between 1 and 4 metres high and has phyllodes that measure 6 to 14 cm long and 0.8 to 1.5 mm wide. These are straight or slightly curved. The globular yellow flowerheads appear in racemes (groups of 3 to 11) in the phyllode axils predominantly from June to December. Plants may flower up to three times a year. These are followed by straight or slightly curved seed pods that are 4 to 18 cm long and 4 to 8 mm wide.

See also
List of Acacia species

References

subulata
Flora of New South Wales
Fabales of Australia
Taxa named by Aimé Bonpland